Larry Shaw is an American film director, television director and film and television producer.

As a television director, some of his credits include Desperate Housewives, 21 Jump Street, Star Trek: The Next Generation, The X-Files, Parker Lewis Can't Lose, Lizzie McGuire and Defiance.

As a producer, he worked on Desperate Housewives, as well as directing and producing for Stingray and was an associate producer on Hunter which ran from 1984 to 1991.

Shaw has also directed a number of television films, most notably Cadet Kelly (2002) starring Hilary Duff, who he previously worked with on Lizzie McGuire.

Shaw's latest projects, as of 2016, includes Freeform's Guilt.

References

External links

American film directors
American film producers
American television directors
American television producers
Living people
Place of birth missing (living people)
Year of birth missing (living people)